Seaman Muhammed Anas Yahiya (born 17 September 1994) is an Indian sprinter who specialises in the 400 metres distance. He competed at the 2016 Summer Olympics in the 400 metres and the 4 × 400 m relay, and holds the national record (45.24) in the 400 meters, which he set at the 2019 Czech Athletics Championships.

Early life 
He was born on 17 September 1994 in Nilamel. Anas took up athletics at the Style Sports Academy in Nilamel. He initially trained in the long jump, and changed to 400 m by chance, when his school team was looking for a last-minute replacement for a 400 m competition. His younger brother competed in the long jump at the 2017 World University Games.

He studied at Sree Krishna College, which was affiliated to the Calicut University. He represented the university at the national level.

Career 
Anas earlier broke the national 400 m record at the Polish Athletics Championships in June 2016, clocking 45.40 seconds, the exact qualification mark for the 2016 Olympics. He became the third Indian athlete to qualify for this Olympic event, after Milkha Singh (1956 and 1960) and K. M. Binu (2004).

In July 2016, Anas was part of the relay team that broke the national 4 × 400 metres record in Bangalore and qualified for the Rio Olympics. The quartet of Anas, Kunhu Muhammed, Ayyasamy Dharun and Arokia Rajiv clocked 3:00:91, improving their own record of 3:02.17 set four weeks earlier in Turkey. This result placed them 13th in the world ranking.

At the 2018 Asian Games, Anas won two silver medals and one gold medal, in the individual 400 m, men's 4×400 m and mixed 4×400 m relays respectively . At the 2018 Commonwealth Games he placed fourth in the 400 m, while his men's 4×400 m failed to finish.

In 2022 Anas was included in the 4x400m relay team for the Commonwealth Games 2022 by the Athletics Federation of India (AFI) in place of an injured athlete Rajesh Ramesh.

References

1994 births
Living people
People from Kollam district
Indian male sprinters
Athletes from Kerala
Athletes (track and field) at the 2016 Summer Olympics
Athletes (track and field) at the 2020 Summer Olympics
Olympic athletes of India
Athletes (track and field) at the 2018 Commonwealth Games
Athletes (track and field) at the 2022 Commonwealth Games
World Athletics Championships athletes for India
Athletes (track and field) at the 2018 Asian Games
Asian Games gold medalists for India
Asian Games silver medalists for India
Asian Games medalists in athletics (track and field)
Medalists at the 2018 Asian Games
South Asian Games gold medalists for India
South Asian Games medalists in athletics
Commonwealth Games competitors for India
Indian Navy personnel
Recipients of the Arjuna Award